After All is a Canadian drama short film, directed by Alexis Fortier Gauthier and released in 2006. The film stars Catherine De Léan as Claire, a woman who decides, after having consumed too much alcohol, to go visit her ex-boyfriend Philippe (Rémi-Pierre Paquin) for the first time since their breakup.

The film won the Genie Award for Best Live Action Short Drama at the 28th Genie Awards, as well as the award for Best Canadian Short Film at the 2007 CFC Worldwide Short Film Festival.

References

External links
 

2006 films
2006 drama films
Best Live Action Short Drama Genie and Canadian Screen Award winners
Quebec films
2000s French-language films
French-language Canadian films
Canadian drama short films
2000s Canadian films